Jacqueline "Jacquie" Brooks (born September 15, 1967, in Edmonton, Alberta) is an Olympic dressage rider. Representing Canada, she competed at two Summer Olympics (in 2008 and 2012).

Jacqueline's best Olympic results came in 2008, when she placed 8th in team dressage and 29th in individual dressage. She also competed at two editions of Dressage World Cup Finals (in 2007 and 2013).

References

Living people
1967 births
Sportspeople from Edmonton
Canadian female equestrians
Canadian dressage riders
Equestrians at the 2008 Summer Olympics
Equestrians at the 2012 Summer Olympics
Olympic equestrians of Canada
Equestrians at the 2003 Pan American Games
Pan American Games medalists in equestrian
Pan American Games silver medalists for Canada
Medalists at the 2003 Pan American Games